Dreams is the thirty-first studio album by Neil Diamond. It was produced by Diamond and released by Columbia Records in 2010. The album contains cover versions of popular songs that Diamond claims in the liner notes are among his favorites.  Among them is "I'm a Believer", which he wrote for The Monkees back in 1966.  Dreams ranked at number eight on the Billboard 200 chart.

Track listing

Personnel
 Neil Diamond – lead vocals, guitar
 Hadley Hockensmith – guitar
 Reinie Press – bass guitar
 King Errisson – percussion
 Alan Lindgren – piano, Hammond B3 organ, arrangements
 Tom Hensley – piano, horn arrangements (14) 
 Benmont Tench – piano (11)
 Tommy Morgan – harmonica (5)
 Gabe Witcher – fiddle (2)
 Don Markese – alto, baritone and tenor saxophones; clarinet
 Larry Klimas – tenor saxophone, flute
 John Fumo – trumpet, flugelhorn
 Arturo Velasco – trombone, bass trombone
 Robert Shulgold – flute
 Joseph Stone – oboe
 Andrew Klein – bassoon
 Joseph Meyer – French horn
 Assa Drori – concertmaster
 Timothy B. Schmit – harmony vocals (4)

Production
 Producer – Neil Diamond 
 Production Coordinator – Sam Cole
 Recorded, Mixed and Mastered by Bernie Becker
 Assistant Mastering – Dale Becker
 Recorded at Arch Angel Studios (Los Angeles, CA) and Eastwest Studios (Hollywood, CA).
 Mixed at  Arch Angel Studios
 Mastered at Bernie Becker Mastering
 Art Direction and Design – Glen Nakasako at SMOG Design, Inc. (Los Angeles, CA).
 Photography – Jesse Diamond and Frank Ockenfels

Charts

Weekly charts

Year-end charts

References

Neil Diamond albums
2010 albums
Columbia Records albums
Covers albums